The Sainte Marie Roman Catholic Church Parish Historic District, located in the city of Manchester, New Hampshire, United States, includes seven red brick buildings dating from the late 19th century and 20th century. The district was placed on the National Register of Historic Places in September 2019.

Included within the district are:
 Holy Angels School and Convent, built in 1885. This building contains the Ste. Marie Child Care Center on the lower floors and the meeting space for the Youth Ministry on the top floors.
 Ste. Marie Church, built during the 1890s, which houses four bells from Louviers, France, and features a  spire
 Marist Brothers Home, built in 1905. This building is now known as St. Joseph Residents, and houses the sisters of Daughters of Mary, Mother of Healing Love
 Sisters Home and convent, built in 1907. This building contains the Parish Offices, meeting rooms, and a perpetual adoration chapel.
 Rectory building, built in 1911
 Hevey School, built in 1911–12 and named for Monsignor Pierre Hevey, second pastor of Ste. Marie (A Gymnasium was added to the school in 1966, the school was also renovated at this time) This building contains Holy Family Academy (New Hampshire), a private Catholic school serving students in grades 7-12.
 A concrete garage for priests who reside in the rectory was built in 1954

See also
National Register of Historic Places listings in Hillsborough County, New Hampshire
America's Credit Union Museum, also located on Notre Dame Avenue in Manchester
Ste. Marie Church (Manchester, New Hampshire)
Holy Family Academy (New Hampshire), located in the Hevey School
 Monsignor Pierre Hevey, second pastor of Ste. Marie Parish
Roman Catholic Diocese of Manchester

References

Historic districts on the National Register of Historic Places in New Hampshire
Historic districts in Hillsborough County, New Hampshire
Manchester, New Hampshire
National Register of Historic Places in Hillsborough County, New Hampshire